Seth Bongartz is an American politician and a member of the Democratic Party who has served in the Vermont House of Representatives since 2021.

Bongartz serves on the House Committee on Natural Resources, Fish, and Wildlife and the Legislative Committee on Administrative Rules (LCAR).

References

21st-century American politicians
Living people
Democratic Party members of the Vermont House of Representatives
Year of birth missing (living people)